Dodonaea hirsuta is a species of shrub endemic to New South Wales, and Queensland. Its fruit is red to yellow-red, has three to four wings, and grows from September to December.

References

External links

hirsuta
Endemic flora of Australia
Sapindales of Australia